The Paisley Burgh Police was the police force responsible for the town of Paisley, Scotland until it was subsumed into the Strathclyde Police.

References

Defunct police forces of Scotland
1847 establishments in the United Kingdom
1974 disestablishments in Scotland